The Surgeon is a TV medical drama.

The Surgeon may also refer to:

The Surgeon (novel)
The Surgeon (painting)
The Surgeon (video game)

See also
Surgeon (disambiguation)